Makin' Hay is the second studio album by Canadian country music group Farmer's Daughter, and was released in 1996 by Universal Music Canada.

Track listing

 "Cornfields or Cadillacs" (Marcus Hummon, Monty Powell, Mike Noble) - 3:33
 "Lonely Gypsy Wind" (Greg Barnhill, Jake Leiske, Angela Kelman, Shauna Rae Samograd) - 3:08
 "Now That I'm On My Own" (Darrell Scott) - 3:27
 "You Said" (Beth Nielsen Chapman) - 3:28
 "Inclemency" (Barnhill, Leiske, Kelman, Samograd) - 3:55
 "Ode to Billie Joe" (Bobbie Gentry) - 4:36
 "Tall Drink of Water" (Zack Turner, Susan Longacre) - 3:19
 "Walking Away for You" (Hummon) - 4:19
 "This That and the Other Thing" (Spencer Bernard, Tim Norton) - 4:28
 "What It's All About" (Barnhill, Leiske, Kelman, Samograd) - 3:38

Chart performance

Farmer's Daughter albums
1996 albums